This page details football records and statistics in Italy.

Team records

Most championships won

Overall
 36, Juventus

Consecutive titles
 9, Juventus (2011–12 season to 2019–20 season)
 5, Juventus (1930–31 season to 1934–35 season) 
 5, Torino (1942–43 season and the 1945–46 season to 1948–49 season)
 5, Internazionale (2005–06 season to 2009–10 season)

Most seasons in Serie A
 90, Internazionale

Most seasons in Serie B
 63, Brescia

Most points in a season
2 Teams in Final Round (2 points per win) 1928–29
 4, Bologna

6 Teams in Final Round (2 points per win) 1926–27
 14, Torino

8 Teams in Final Round (2 points per win) 1927–28 - 1945–46
 22, Torino

16 Teams (2 points per win) 1934–35 to 1942–43 - 1967–68 to 1987–88
 51, Juventus 1976–77

18 Teams (2 points per win) 1929–30 to 1933–34 - 1952–53 to 1966–67 - 1988–89 to 1993–94
 58, Internazionale 1988–89

18 Teams (3 points per win) 1994–95 to 2003–04
 82, Milan 2003–04

20 Teams (2 points per win) 1946–47 - 1948–49 to 1951–52
 63, Torino 1946–47

20 Teams (3 points per win) 2004–05 to present
 102, Juventus 2013–14

21 Teams (2 points per win) 1947–48
 65, Torino

Most consecutive wins
 17, Internazionale, 2006–07
 15, Juventus, 2015–16
 13, Napoli, 2016–17 to 2017–18
 13, Juventus, 2013–14 to 2014–15
 12, Juventus, 2013–14 and 2017–18
 11, Roma, 2005–06 and 2012–13 to 2013–14
 11, Lazio, 2019–20
 11, Internazionale, 2020–21
 11, Napoli, 2022–23
 10, Juventus, 1931–32 and 2015–16
 10, Milan, 1950–51
 10, Bologna, 1963–64
 10, Napoli, 2017–18

Most consecutive home wins
 33, Juventus, 2015–16 to 2016–17

Most consecutive away wins
 12, Roma, 2016–17 to 2017–18

Longest win streak from the start of a Serie A season
 10, Roma, 2013–14

Longest win streak without conceding from the start of a Serie A season
 5, Juventus, 2014–15

Longest win streak from the start of the second half of a Serie A season
 11, Internazionale, 2020–21

Most wins in a single season
 33, Juventus, 2013–14 (38 matches)
 30, Internazionale, 2006–07 (38 matches)
 30, Juventus, 2017–18 (38 matches)
 29, Juventus, 2015–16, 2016–17 (38 matches)
 29, Torino, 1947–48 (40 matches)
 28, Milan, 2005–06 (38 matches)
 28, Roma, 2016–17 (38 matches)
 28, Napoli, 2017–18 (38 matches)
 28, Juventus, 2018–19 (38 matches)
 28, Internazionale, 2020–21 (38 matches)
 27, Internazionale, 1950–51 (38 matches)

Most home wins in a season
 19, Juventus, 2013–14 (19 matches)

Most away wins in a season
 16, Milan, 2020–21 (19 matches)

Most matches won

 1,654, Juventus
 1,520, Internazionale
 1,439, Milan
 1,262, Roma
 1,109, Fiorentina

Most goals scored

 5,274, Juventus
 5,139, Internazionale
 4,877, Milan
 4,401, Roma
 3,914, Fiorentina

Most goals in a season
21 Teams
125, Torino, 1947–48

20 Teams
118, Milan, 1949–50

18 Teams
95, Fiorentina, 1958–59

16 Teams
75, Juventus, 1942–43

Longest unbeaten streak
 58, Milan, 1990–91 to 1992–93 (26 May 1991, 0–0 v Parma; 21 March 1993, 0–1 v Parma)

Longest unbeaten streaks in a single Serie A season
16 Teams
 30, Perugia, 1978–79

18 Teams
 34, Milan, 1991–92

20 Teams
 38, Juventus, 2011–12

Individual records

Most championships won

Players in bold are still active in Serie A.

10 championships
Gianluigi Buffon (all with Juventus)

9 championships
Giorgio Chiellini (all with Juventus)
Leonardo Bonucci (1 with Internazionale + 8 with Juventus)

8 championships
Virginio Rosetta (2 with Pro Vercelli + 6 with Juventus)
Giovanni Ferrari (5 with Juventus + 2 with Internazionale + 1 with Bologna)
Giuseppe Furino (all with Juventus)
Andrea Barzagli (all with Juventus)

7 championships
Roberto Bettega (all with Juventus)
Alessandro Costacurta (all with Milan)
Ciro Ferrara (2 with Napoli + 5 with Juventus)
Stephan Lichtsteiner (all with Juventus)
Paolo Maldini (all with Milan)
Claudio Marchisio (all with Juventus)
Gaetano Scirea (all with Juventus)

6 championships
Guido Ara (all with Pro Vercelli)
Antonello Cuccureddu (all with Juventus)
Edoardo Pasteur (all with Genoa)
James Richardson Spensley (all with Genoa)
Claudio Gentile (all with Juventus)
Franco Baresi (all with Milan)
Antonio Cabrini (all with Juventus)
Franco Causio (all with Juventus)
Dino Zoff (all with Juventus)
Roberto Donadoni (all with Milan)
Dejan Stanković (5 with Internazionale + 1 with Lazio)
Walter Samuel (5 with Internazionale + 1 with Roma)
Alessandro Del Piero (all with Juventus)
Guglielmo Gabetto (1 with Juventus + 5 with Torino)
Andrea Pirlo (2 with Milan + 4 with Juventus)
Kwadwo Asamoah (all with Juventus)
Martín Cáceres (all with Juventus)

5 championships
Zlatan Ibrahimović (3 with Internazionale + 2 with Milan)
Henri Dapples (all with Genoa)
Enrico Pasteur (all with Genoa)
Filippo Galli (all with Milan)
Renato Cesarini (all with Juventus)
Raimundo Orsi (all with Juventus)
Umberto Caligaris (all with Juventus)
Mario Varglien (all with Juventus)
Giovanni Varglien (all with Juventus)
Gianpiero Combi (all with Juventus)
Giuseppe Grezar (all with Torino)
Valentino Mazzola (all with Torino)
Franco Ossola (all with Torino)
Ezio Loik (all with Torino)
Pietro Ferraris (2 with Internazionale + 3 with Torino)
Lorenzo Buffon (4 with Milan + 1 with Internazionale)
Sandro Salvadore (2 with Milan + 3 with Juventus)
Giampiero Boniperti (all with Juventus)
Tarcisio Burgnich (1 with Juventus + 4 with Internazionale)
Francesco Morini (all with Juventus)
Luciano Spinosi (all with Juventus)
Marco Tardelli (all with Juventus)
Pietro Fanna (3 with Juventus + 1 with Hellas Verona + 1 with Internazionale)
Sebastiano Rossi (all with Milan)
Demetrio Albertini (all with Milan)
Mauro Tassotti (all with Milan)
Antonio Conte (all with Juventus)
Alessio Tacchinardi (all with Juventus)
Júlio César (all with Internazionale)
Javier Zanetti (all with Internazionale)
Iván Córdoba (all with Internazionale)
Marco Materazzi (all with Internazionale)
Esteban Cambiasso (all with Internazionale)
Paolo Orlandoni (all with Internazionale)
Francesco Toldo (all with Internazionale)
Simone Padoin (all with Juventus)
Sami Khedira (all with Juventus)
Paulo Dybala (all with Juventus)
Alex Sandro (all with Juventus)
Juan Cuadrado (all with Juventus)
Daniele Rugani (all with Juventus)
Arturo Vidal (4 with Juventus + 1 with Internazionale)

Most consecutive championships won
Giorgio Chiellini: 9 (2012–2020, all with Juventus)

Oldest player to win a championship
Gianluigi Buffon: 42 years (2019–20)

Appearances

Top thirty most appearances, all-time (only Serie A regular-season games)

Updated as of 18 March 2023

Players in bold are still active in Serie A.

Top five most appearances, still active in Serie A. (only Serie A regular-season games).

Updated as of 18 March 2023

Oldest players
Updated as of 26 February 2023.
Players who were at least 40 years old when they played their last match.
 Marco Ballotta  (last game: 11 May 2008, Lazio)
 Gianluigi Buffon  (last game: 12 May 2021, Juventus)
 Francesco Antonioli  (last game: 6 May 2012, Cesena)
 Alberto Fontana  (last game: 15 November 2008, Palermo)
 Roberto Colombo  (last game: 15 April 2017, Cagliari)
 Zlatan Ibrahimović  (last game: 26 February 2023, Milan)
 Dino Zoff  (last game: 15 May 1983, Juventus)
 Alessandro Costacurta  (last game: 19 May 2007, Milan)
 Pietro Vierchowod  (last game: 16 April 2000, Piacenza)
 Paolo Maldini  (last game: 31 May 2009, Milan)
 Javier Zanetti  (last game: 18 May 2014, Internazionale)
 Francesco Totti  (last game: 28 May 2017, Roma)
 Daniele Balli  (last game: 4 May 2008, Empoli)
 Albano Bizzarri  (last game: 20 May 2018, Udinese)
 Silvio Piola  (last game: 7 March 1954, Novara)
 Enrico Albertosi  (last game: 10 February 1980, Milan)
 Nicola Pavarini  (last game: 18 May 2014, Parma)
 Gianluca Pagliuca  (last game: 18 February 2007, Ascoli)
 Sergio Pellissier  (last game: 25 May 2019, Chievo)
 Luca Bucci  (last game: 19 April 2009, Napoli)
 Stefano Sorrentino  (last game: 14 April 2019, Chievo)

Youngest Italian players
 Wisdom Amey; (Bologna),  (12 May 2021)
 Amedeo Amadei; (Roma),  (2 May 1937)
 Pietro Pellegri; (Genoa),  (22 December 2016)
 Gianni Rivera; (Alessandria),  (2 June 1959)
 Aristide Rossi; (Cremonese),  (29 June 1930)
 Giuseppe Campione; (Bologna),  (25 June 1989)
 Andrea Pirlo; (Brescia)  (21 May 1995)
 Stephan El Shaarawy; (Genoa)  (21 December 2008)
 Lorenzo Tassi; (Brescia)  (22 May 2011)
 Stefano Okaka; (Roma)  (18 December 2005)
 Paolo Pupita; (Cesena)  (28 January 1990)
 Nicola Ventola; (Bari)  (6 November 1994)
 Francesco Totti; (Roma)  (28 March 1993)
 Giuseppe Sacchi; (Milan)  (25 October 1942)
 Gianluigi Donnarumma; (Milan)  (25 October 2015)

Youngest foreign players

 Valeri Bojinov; (Lecce),  (22 January 2002)
 Lampros Choutos; (Roma),  (21 April 1996)
 Nana Welbeck; (Brescia),  (22 May 2011)
 Kacper Urbański; (Bologna),  (12 May 2021)
 Claiton; (Bologna),  (17 June 2001)
 Mohammed Aliyu Datti; (Milan),  (24 January 1999)
 Frank Ongfiang; (Venezia),  (17 June 2001)
 Khouma Babacar; (Fiorentina),  (27 February 2010)
 Goran Slavkovski; (Internazionale),  (7 May 2006)
 Stephen Appiah; (Udinese),  (11 February 1998)

Since FIFA prevented player inter-association movement for under-18 players (U16 within EU), the only possibility to break the record will be a foreign player who has immigrated to Italy using reasons other than football.

Oldest player to debut in Serie A
 Maurizio Pugliesi  (15 May 2016, Empoli)

Most consecutive appearances in Serie A
Dino Zoff, 332

Most consecutive appearances in Serie A by an outfield player
Javier Zanetti, 162

Most consecutive appearances in Serie A for a single club
Dino Zoff, 330 (with Juventus)

Most seasons in Serie A
Paolo Maldini and Francesco Totti, 25

Most consecutive seasons in Serie A
Paolo Maldini and Francesco Totti, 25

Most career club appearances by an Italian player
Gianluigi Buffon, 967 (as of 11 March 2023)

Most appearances for a single Italian club
Paolo Maldini, 902, with Milan

Goalscoring

Top 30 goalscorers, all-time (only Serie A regular-season games)

Updated as of 18 March 2023

Players in bold are still active in Serie A.

Top five goal scorers, still active in Serie A (only Serie A regular-season games).

Updated as of 18 March 2023

Most goals from a penalty kick
Top five penalty kick scorers, all-time (only Serie A regular-season games)

Updated 29 January 2017

Players in bold are still active in Serie A.

Most penalty kicks scored in a single Serie A season
Ciro Immobile, 14 (2019–20)

Most goals from a free kick
Top ten free kick scorers, all-time (only Serie A regular-season games)

Updated 17 December 2017

Players in bold are still active in Serie A.

Most goals from a free kick in a single Serie A match

Giuseppe Signori and Siniša Mihajlović, 3 (in Lazio 3–1 Atalanta, 10 April 1994; and Lazio 5–2 Sampdoria, 13 December 1998, respectively)

Most different teams scored against in Serie A

Francesco Totti, Alberto Gilardino, and Roberto Baggio, 38

Fastest goal scored in Serie A
Rafael Leão, 6.2 seconds (20 December 2020, in Sassuolo–Milan, 1–2)

Oldest goalscorer in Serie A

Zlatan Ibrahimović,  (18 March 2023, in Udinese–Milan, 3–1)

Youngest goalscorer in Serie A

Amedeo Amadei, 15 years, 287 days (9 May 1937, in Lucchese–Roma, 5–1)

Youngest players to score 100 goals in Serie A
Updated 18 March 2018

Players in bold are still active in Serie A.

Sources:

Most goals in a single Serie A match
Silvio Piola and Omar Sívori, 6

Most braces in Serie A
Silvio Piola and Gunnar Nordahl, 49

Most hat-tricks in Serie A
Players in bold are still active in Serie A.

Gunnar Nordahl, 17

Youngest player to score a brace in Serie A
Pietro Pellegri, 16 years and 184 days (17 September 2017, in Genoa–Lazio, 2–3)

Oldest player to score a brace in Serie A
Zlatan Ibrahimović, 40 years and 48 days (20 November 2021 Fiorentina 4–3 AC Milan)

Youngest player to score a hat-trick in Serie A
Silvio Piola, 17 years and 132 days

Oldest player to score a hat-trick in Serie A
Rodrigo Palacio, 39 years and 86 days

Youngest player to score more than three goals in a single Serie A match
Silvio Piola, 18 years and 54 days

Oldest player to score five goals in a single Serie A match
Miroslav Klose, 34 years and 330 days

Oldest player to score their first goal in Serie A
Angelo Mattea, 38 years and 7 days, for Casale, in a 5–1 away loss to Ambrosiana on 28 October 1930

Most consecutive Serie A seasons with at least one goal
Francesco Totti, 23 (1994–95 to 2016–17)

Oldest player to win the Serie A top scorer award
Luca Toni (38 years, 2014–15)

Most Serie A top scorer awards
Gunnar Nordahl, 5 (1949–50, 1950–51, 1952–53, 1953–54, 1954–55)

Most goals in a single Serie A season
36, Gonzalo Higuaín (2015–16) and Ciro Immobile (2019–20)

Most headed goals in Serie A
Christian Vieri

Most headed goals in a single Serie A season
Oliver Bierhoff (15 out of 19, 1998–99)

Most consecutive Serie A appearances with at least one goal scored
Gabriel Batistuta (13 consecutive Serie A games, 2 in 1992–93 and 11 in 1994–95 with Fiorentina)

Most consecutive Serie A appearances with at least one goal scored in a single season
Gabriel Batistuta (in 1994–95, with Fiorentina), Fabio Quagliarella (in 2018–19, with Sampdoria) and Cristiano Ronaldo (in 2019–20, with Juventus) (11 consecutive Serie A games)

Most consecutive Serie A appearances with at least one goal scored since the start of a single season
Gabriel Batistuta (in 1994–95, with Fiorentina) (11 consecutive Serie A games)

Most consecutive Serie A away appearances with at least one goal scored
Giuseppe Signori (from 17 May 1992 to 28 February 1993; 1 in 1991–92 with Foggia, and 9 in 1992–93 with Lazio) (10 consecutive Serie A away games with a goal)

Most consecutive Serie A away appearances with at least one goal scored in a single season
Cristiano Ronaldo (in 2018–19 and 2019–20, with Juventus) and Giuseppe Signori (in 1992–93, with Lazio) (9 consecutive Serie A away games with a goal)

Most seasons with at least 10 goals scored in all competitions by an Italian player
Alessandro Del Piero (17 seasons)

Highest-scoring Italian players in all competitions

The following table shows the ten Italian players that have scored the most professional goals in total throughout their career, at both club and international level (excluding youth competitions).

Players in bold are still active in Serie A.

Most own-goals scored in Serie A history
Franco Baresi and Riccardo Ferri (eight)

Goalkeeping
The following table shows the goalkeepers that have longest consecutive run without conceding a goal in Serie A.  Length column is in minutes.

Players in bold are still active in Serie A. Minutes in bold indicate an active run.

Most clean sheets

Updated 22 February 2021

Players in bold are still active in Serie A.

Gianluigi Buffon, 299

Most consecutive clean sheets

Players in bold are still active in Serie A.

Gianluigi Buffon, 10 (17 January 2016 to 11 March 2016)

Most clean sheets in a single season
Players in bold are still active in Serie A.

Gianluigi Buffon, 21 (2011–12 and 2015–16)

Most penalties saved
Samir Handanović, 26

Players in bold are still active in Serie A.

Updated as of 23 May 2021

Most consecutive penalties saved

Players in bold are still active in Serie A.

Samir Handanović, 6

Oldest goalkeeper to save a penalty

Players in bold are still active in Serie A.

Gianluigi Buffon, 43 years and 104 days (12 May 2021, in Sassuolo–Juventus, 1–3)

Discipline

Most red cards

Updated 29 January 2017

Players in bold are still active in Serie A.

Coaching

Most appearances in Serie A
Carlo Mazzone, 792 (excluding 5 appearances in play-off matches)

Most Serie A titles
Giovanni Trapattoni, 7

Most consecutive Serie A titles
Massimiliano Allegri, 5 (all with Juventus)

Most Serie A titles with a single club
Giovanni Trapattoni, 6 (with Juventus)

Most Serie A titles with different clubs
Giovanni Trapattoni, 7 with 2 clubs (6 with Juventus, 1 with Inter)
Massimiliano Allegri, 6 with 2 clubs (1 with Milan, 5 with Juventus)
Fabio Capello, 5 with 2 clubs (4 with Milan, 1 with Roma)
Antonio Conte, 4 with 2 clubs (3 with Juventus, 1 with Inter)
Árpád Weisz, 3 with 2 clubs (1 with Ambrosiana, 2 with Bologna)
Fulvio Bernardini, 2 with 2 clubs (1 with Fiorentina, 1 with Bologna)
Nils Liedholm, 2 with 2 clubs (1 with Milan, 1 with Roma)

Youngest manager to win a Serie A title
Armando Castellazzi, 33 years and 199 days, (with Ambrosiana–Inter, 1937–38)

Oldest manager to win a Serie A title
Maurizio Sarri,  (with Juventus, 2019–20)

Most consecutive appearances in Serie A
Nereo Rocco, 605 (between 1955 and 1974, with Padova, Milan, and Torino)

Most appearances in Serie A with a single club
Giovanni Trapattoni, 402 (with Juventus)

Most victories in Serie A
Giovanni Trapattoni, 352 (16 with Milan, 213 with Juventus, 87 with Inter, 7 with Cagliari, and 29 with Fiorentina)

Most consecutive victories in Serie A
Roberto Mancini, 17 (with Inter, 2006–07 Serie A)

Most victories in Serie A with a single team
Giovanni Trapattoni, 213 (with Juventus)

Top scorers (capocannonieri) by season

All-time highest bolded.

Source for figures before 1997 from RSSSF.com:
Source for figures after 1997 from lega-calcio.it:

Retired numbers

Up to the present day, nineteen different top clubs in Italy have retired numbers for different reasons, mostly in recognition of their former players.

Notes

Most successful clubs overall (1898–present)
The following table includes only Italian, European and worldwide competitions organised respectively by FIGC, UEFA and FIFA since 1898. The figures in bold represent the most times this competition has been won by an Italian team. Teams which have one at least one official title are included, ranked by number of overall titles at national and/or international level and listed in chronological order in case of a tie. In particular, note that the UEFA Cup unlike the Inter-Cities Fairs Cup was an official competition organized by UEFA. Original idea of the ICFC was a trade fairs promoting competition and was not organised by UEFA. It is not considered as an official tournament by UEFA due to the major idea of promoted trade fairs and the system of admission of the first editions. At the beginning it was only open to a certain few clubs from some European countries that were promoting trade and not an open football tournament. However, it is the official predecessor of UEFA Cup - Europa League (by UEFA) and recognized by FIFA (and FIGC) as a major trophy.

Key

By club

Additionally, the Alta Italia Championship, also known as Campionato di guerra (War Championship), won by the Vigili del Fuoco della Spezia in 1944 (the only edition ever held), was recognised by the FIGC in 2002 as the equivalent to the Serie A championship of that year.
# Although not organised by UEFA, the Inter-Cities Fairs Cup is included here under UEFA as it is the official predecessor to the UEL and acknowledged by FIFA as a major trophy. 
* Although organized by UEFA (and CONMEBOL), the Intercontinental Cup is included here under FIFA for being the predecessor to the FCWC.

Notes

References

External links
Official Site 
Results since 1929 in Serie A
Forza Italian Football Site

Football records and statistics in Italy
 
Football in Italy